Norton USD 211 is a public unified school district headquartered in Norton, Kansas, United States.  The district includes the communities of Norton, Lenora, Edmond, Clayton, Dellvale, New Almelo, Oronoque, and nearby rural areas.

Schools
The school district operates the following schools:
 Norton High School
 Norton Middle School
 Norton Elementary School

History
In 2010 it absorbed the former West Solomon USD 213, which had dissolved.

It formerly operated Lenora Elementary School.

See also
 Kansas State Department of Education
 Kansas State High School Activities Association
 List of high schools in Kansas
 List of unified school districts in Kansas

References

External links
 

School districts in Kansas
Norton County, Kansas